The women's halfpipe competition of the 2018 Winter Olympics was held from 12 to 13 February 2018 at the Bogwang Phoenix Park in Pyeongchang, South Korea.

In the victory ceremony, the medals were presented by Larry Probst, member of the International Olympic Committee, accompanied by Dexter Paine, International Ski Federation vice president.

Qualification

The top 24 athletes in the Olympic quota allocation list qualified, with a maximum of four athletes per National Olympic Committee (NOC) allowed. All athletes qualifying must also have placed in the top 30 of a FIS World Cup event or the FIS Freestyle Ski and Snowboarding World Championships 2017 during the qualification period (July 1, 2016 to January 21, 2018) and also have a minimum of 50 FIS points to compete. If the host country, South Korea at the 2018 Winter Olympics did not qualify, their chosen athlete would displace the last qualified athlete, granted all qualification criterion was met.

Results

Qualification
 Q — Qualified for the Final

The top 12 athletes in the qualifiers move on to the medal round.

Final
The final was held on 13 February at 11:00.

References

Women's snowboarding at the 2018 Winter Olympics